The following is a list of pipeline accidents in the United States in 1996. It is one of several lists of U.S. pipeline accidents. See also: list of natural gas and oil production accidents in the United States.

Incidents 

This is not a complete list of all pipeline accidents. For natural gas alone, the Pipeline and Hazardous Materials Safety Administration (PHMSA), a United States Department of Transportation agency, has collected data on more than 3,200 accidents deemed serious or significant since 1987.

A "significant incident" results in any of the following consequences:
 Fatality or injury requiring in-patient hospitalization.
 $50,000 or more in total costs, measured in 1984 dollars.
 Liquid releases of five or more barrels (42 US gal/barrel).
 Releases resulting in an unintentional fire or explosion.

PHMSA and the National Transportation Safety Board (NTSB) post-incident data and results of investigations into accidents involving pipelines that carry a variety of products, including natural gas, oil, diesel fuel, gasoline, kerosene, jet fuel, carbon dioxide, and other substances. Occasionally pipelines are re-purposed to carry different products.

The following incidents occurred during 1996:
* January 6, Pennsylvania: A gas pipeline failure excised a  section of pipe. The gas later ignited, causing a vegetation fire in East Stroudsburg, Pennsylvania. Later inspections found numerous flaws on this pipeline.
* January 9, California: Farm equipment pierced a Chevron crude oil pipeline near Coalinga, California, spilling about 210,000 gallons of crude oil over about four acres of land. 
* January 9, Oklahoma: A Sunoco pipeline leaked from internal corrosion, in McClain County, Oklahoma, spilling about 5,900 gallons of petroleum.
* January 12, Texas: A backhoe hit a six-inch Amoco gas pipeline in Andrews, Texas. Consequently, the pipeline exploded, causing severe burns to two workers and minor injuries to two others. One of the workers with severe burns died a few days later. 
* February 5, Missouri: A pipeline ruptured and spilled diesel fuel into a creek in Fairview Heights, Missouri.
* February 7, Pennsylvania: A Columbia Gas Transmission Corp. worker was killed in West Finley, Pennsylvania when the coupling on a pipeline that was being pressure-tested broke loose and hit him.
* February 17, Texas: A Diamond Shamrock propane pipeline was severed by a trenching machine in Parker County, Texas, resulting in the loss of 6,355 barrels of propane. US Highway 377 was shut down while fumes dissipated. 
* February 18, Ohio: A 20-inch natural gas line near South Point, Ohio failed, causing a massive fire. There were no injuries.
* March 1, Utah: An oil sheen in a canal in Salt Lake City, Utah was eventually traced back to a leaking four-inch Chevron diesel fuel pipeline. The pipeline had been damaged by previous excavation. There were no injuries.
* April 23, South Carolina: A Colonial Pipeline line failed near Gaffney, South Carolina, spilling gasoline. At first the spill was reported to be only 250 gallons, but later reports indicated that 1,386 gallons were spilled. Rock abrasion was cited as the cause for the failure.
* May 8, Ohio: A 20-inch Columbia Gas pipeline was ruptured by a crew installing a water pipeline in Oregon, Ohio. One business nearby was evacuated. 
* May 23, Louisiana: A Marathon Petroleum 20-inch pipeline ruptured at a location near Gramercy, Louisiana. Gasoline also entered the Blind River, causing environmental damage and killing fish, wildlife, and vegetation in the area. The pipeline controller did not immediately recognize that the pipeline had failed, and continued to ignore alarms from the pipeline SCADA system.
* May 23, Connecticut: The largest penalty in an environmental case since the 1989 Exxon Valdez oil spill was announced. The Connecticut-based Iroquois Pipeline Operating Company was ordered to pay $22 million in criminal and civil fines for violating federal environmental and safety laws. The violations stemmed from the construction of one of the country's longest natural gas pipelines, running 370 miles from Canada through upstate New York and Connecticut to Long Island. Backfill of the pipeline was one of the issues cited. Four individuals also received jail time.
* June 17, Washington: An Olympic Pipeline products line near Everett, Washington sprung a leak from a buckled area of pipe. About 1,000 gallons of gasoline were spilled into North Ebey Slough. The spill was discovered by a crew installing a water line nearby.
* June 26, South Carolina: A 36-inch Colonial Pipeline ruptured at the Reedy River, near Fork Shoals, South Carolina. The spill polluted a  stretch of the Reedy River, causing significant environmental damage. Floating oil extended about  down the river. Approximately 35,000 fish were killed, along with other aquatic organisms and wildlife. The estimated cost to Colonial Pipeline for cleanup and settlement with the State of South Carolina was $20.5 million. No one was injured in the accident. The pipeline was operating at reduced pressure due to known corrosion issues, but pipeline operator confusion led to an accidental return to normal pressure in that pipeline section, causing the rupture.
* August 4, Minnesota:  of unspecified petroleum product spilled from a Lakehead pipe near Donaldson, Minnesota.
* August 24, Texas: A Koch butane pipeline ruptured, causing an explosion and fire near Kemp, Texas. Two teenagers were killed after driving into the unseen butane cloud while going to report the pipeline leak. A mobile home was also destroyed by the fire. The leak was caused by external corrosion. The pipeline was only 15 years old at the time.
* September 26, Michigan: A bulldozer operator in Grand Haven, Michigan hit and ruptured a Wolverine pipeline. Petroleum ignited, burning the bulldozer operator. About 4,300 gallons of petroleum product was lost.
* October, Washington: The Yellowstone Pipeline was found to be leaking in Spokane County, Washington. An unknown amount of petroleum product contaminated soil in the area, requiring soil remediation.
* October 17, Indiana: A leaking Amoco pipeline caused traffic to be shut down on an industrial area street in Hammond, Indiana, starting on October 17. About 1,250 barrels of gasoline were spilled. The leak was caused by external corrosion of the pipeline, which was installed in 1928.
* October 21, Mississippi: A workman using digging equipment near Runnelstown, Mississippi ruptured a propane pipeline, causing a leak that led to an explosion and fire that destroyed 4 homes, and forced 22 families to evacuate their homes.* October 23, Louisiana: In Tiger Pass, Louisiana, the crew of a Bean Horizon Corporation dredge dropped astern spud into the bottom of the channel in preparation for dredging operations. The spud struck and ruptured a 12-inch submerged natural gas steel pipeline. The pressurized natural gas released from the pipeline enveloped the stern of the dredge and an accompanying tug, then ignited, destroying the dredge and the tug. No fatalities resulted from the accident.* November 5, Tennessee: A Colonial Pipeline stub line in Murfreesboro, Tennessee ruptured, shortly after undergoing maintenance. The accident was caused by a valve being left closed after maintenance, which caused pressure to build up when the pipeline was restarted, rupturing the pipeline.* On November 21, Puerto Rico: An explosion occurred in a shoe store and office building in Rio Piedras, Puerto Rico. Thirty-three people were killed, and at least 69 were injured. Crews from the local gas provider, Enron, had not found any gas leaks previously, despite complaints of propane odor in the buildings.* December 11, Kansas: A natural gas line operated by Williams ruptured just north of Tonganoxie, Kansas. Corrosion around a fitting called a "T-Drip" failed, allowing gas to escape.* December 26, Louisiana:''' A bulldozer ruptured a 10-inch LPG pipeline near Maringouin, Louisiana, forcing the evacuation of nearby residents. There was no explosion or fire.

References

Lists of pipeline accidents in the United States